John McDowell may refer to:
 John McDowell (born 1942), South African philosopher
 John McDowell (American football) (born 1942), American football player
 John McDowell (bishop) (born 1956), bishop of Clogher in the Church of Ireland
 John McDowell (footballer) (born 1951), English footballer
 John McDowell (Manitoba politician) (1894–1980), Canadian politician from Manitoba
 John McDowell (Pennsylvania politician) (1902–1957), American politician from Pennsylvania
 John A. McDowell (1853–1927), American politician from Ohio
 John Bernard McDowell (1921–2010), auxiliary bishop of the Roman Catholic Diocese of Pittsburgh, Pennsylvania
 John G. McDowell (1794–1866), New York politician
 John Holmes McDowell (born 1946), folklorist
 John William McDowell (c. 1922–2006), Northern Irish political activist
 Johnny McDowell (1915–1952), American racecar driver

See also 
 Jack McDowell (born 1966), baseball player